JV may refer to:

People
Jonas Valančiūnas, Lithuanian basketball player
Jonathan Velasco, Australian basketball player
Jack Valenti, former head of the Motion Picture Association of America
Jeff Vandergrift, host of radio show The Dog House (talk show) 
Jonathan Vaughters, American cycling team manager and former racing cyclist
Justin Verlander, a pitcher for the New York Mets of Major League Baseball
Jacques Villeneuve, a Formula 1 World Champion of 1997 
Jaclyn Victor, first Malaysian Idol winner
John Virgo, snooker player and commentator
Jason Voorhees, a fictional character in the Jason horror films
Justin Vernon, a musician and a member of the bands Bon Iver and Volcano Choir
Jesse Ventura, a former pro-wrestler and the 38th governor of Minnesota
JV Ejercito (born 1969), Filipino politician

Other uses
JV, a series of synthesizers released by the Roland Corporation during the early 1990s
JV!, a Russian media company owned by Mikhail Prokhorov
Jesuit Volunteer Corps
Joint venture, a strategic alliance between two or more parties to undertake economic activity together
Bearskin Airlines (IATA code JV)
Java, an Indonesian island
Javanese language (ISO 639 alpha-2 symbol JV)
Junior varsity team, the level below varsity in high school sports
Judicial vicar, the head of an ecclesiastical tribunal

See also

 
 
 Junior Varsity (disambiguation)
 JVS (disambiguation)
 J (disambiguation)
 V (disambiguation)
 VJ (disambiguation)